Travis Burns (born 6 February 1984) is an Australian former professional rugby league footballer. He formerly played for St Helens in the Super League and the Penrith Panthers in the NRL. He now plays and coach’s for the Wattles Rugby league club in Clifton Queensland

Playing career
Burns made his first grade debut for Manly-Warringah in round 18 of the 2005 NRL season against Penrith at Penrith Park.

Burns was the rookie of the year in 2006 for the Manly-Warringah Sea Eagles.  Burns played both finals games for Manly-Warringah that year as the club were eliminated by St. George Illawarra.  In the 2007 NRL season, he played 12 games for Manly but did not feature in the club's finals campaign or the 2007 NRL Grand Final loss to Melbourne.

Burns signed a three-year deal to play  for the North Queensland Cowboys, starting in 2008. Burns missed numerous games in his first season due to injuries and suspension.

After only two years at the North Queensland club, Burns signed a two-year contract with the Penrith Panthers prior to the 2010 NRL season.

Burns made his début for the Penrith Panthers in round 1, 2010, against the Canberra Raiders alongside Adrian Purtell, Kevin Kingston and Nigel Plum. Burns scored his first try for the club in round 6 against the New Zealand Warriors with the Panthers winning 40–12. Burns played 19 games for the Panthers in 2010 scoring 4 times. Burns alongside Kevin Kingston both signed extensions with the Penrith club until the 2013 NRL season.

Burns played for Hull KR, and was their regular kicker, having scored 48 goals in 14 appearances during the 2014 season.

In September 2014, Burns signed a three-year contract to play for St Helens RLFC. St Helens paid in the region of £60,000 to secure his services from Hull KR.

References

External links
Leigh Centurions profile
St Helens profile
Saints Heritage Society profile

1984 births
Living people
Australian rugby league players
Exiles rugby league team players
Hull Kingston Rovers captains
Hull Kingston Rovers players
Leigh Leopards players
Manly Warringah Sea Eagles players
North Queensland Cowboys players
Penrith Panthers players
Rugby league five-eighths
Rugby league players from Queensland
St Helens R.F.C. players